Lookeba is a town in Caddo County, Oklahoma, United States. The population was 166 at the 2010 census. The name is a portmanteau of the names of three founding fathers: Lowe, Kelley and Baker.

Geography
Lookeba is located in northern Caddo County.  U.S. Route 281 passes just west of the town, leading north  to Interstate 40, north of Hinton and south  to Binger. Sugar Creek travels south-southeast past the east side of the community.

Demographics

As of the census of 2000, there were 131 people, 45 households, and 34 families residing in the town. There were 69 housing units at an average density of 272.7 per square mile (106.6/km2). The racial makeup of the town was 74.81% White, 6.87% Native American, 15.27% from other races, and 3.05% from two or more races. Hispanic or Latino of any race were 19.85% of the population.

There were 45 households, out of which 33.3% had children under the age of 18 living with them, 53.3% were married couples living together, 15.6% had a female householder with no husband present, and 24.4% were non-families. 22.2% of all households were made up of individuals, and 13.3% had someone living alone who was 65 years of age or older. The average household size was 2.91 and the average family size was 3.47.

In the town, the population was spread out, with 31.3% under the age of 18, 13.7% from 18 to 24, 22.1% from 25 to 44, 16.8% from 45 to 64, and 16.0% who were 65 years of age or older. The median age was 30 years. For every 100 females, there were 95.5 males. For every 100 females age 18 and over, there were 87.5 males.

The median income for a household in the town was $20,000, and the median income for a family was $21,875. Males had a median income of $21,563 versus $25,000 for females. The per capita income for the town was $7,791. There were 27.8% of families and 33.1% of the population living below the poverty line, including 37.0% of under eighteens and 15.4% of those over 64.

References

Towns in Caddo County, Oklahoma
Towns in Oklahoma